Fiorenza is an Italian word which is used as a feminine given name and a surname. Related male name is Fiorenzo. People with the name include:

Given name
Fiorenza Bassoli (1948–2020), Italian politician
Fiorenza Calogero (born 1978), Italian musical artist
Fiorenza Cedolins (born 1966), Italian soprano
Fiorenza Cossotto (born 1935), Italian mezzo-soprano
Fiorenza Donato, Italian physicist
Fiorenza Micheli, Italian-American marine ecologist 
Fiorenza Sanudo (died 1371), Duchess of the Archipelago
Fiorenza I Sanudo, Lady of Milos (died after 1397)
Fiorenza Sommaripa (died 1518), Lady of Paros

Surname
Elisabeth Schüssler Fiorenza (born 1938), Romanian-German theologian
Francis Schüssler Fiorenza (born 1941), American theologian
Joseph Fiorenza (1931-2022), American prelate of the Catholic Church
Nicola Fiorenza (after 1700–1764), Italian violinist and composer of the Neapolitan Baroque period
Vito Fiorenza (1927–2015), American photographer

See also
Florence (given name)

Given names derived from plants or flowers
Italian-language surnames
Italian feminine given names